The Duke Blue Devils college football team represents Duke University in the Atlantic Coast Conference (ACC). The Blue Devils compete as part of the NCAA Division I Football Bowl Subdivision. The program has had 23 head coaches since it began play during the 1889 season. Since December 2021, Mike Elko has served as head coach at Duke.

Seven coaches have led Duke in postseason bowl games: Wallace Wade, Eddie Cameron, William D. Murray, Steve Spurrier, Fred Goldsmith, David Cutcliffe, and Elko. Four of those coaches also won conference championships: Wade captured six, Cameron three, and Murray one as a member of the Southern Conference; Murray captured six and Spurrier one as a member of the Atlantic Coast Conference.

Wade is the leader in seasons coached with 16 years as head coach and games won with 110. Floyd J. Egan has the highest winning percentage at 0.900. Ted Roof has the lowest winning percentage of those who have coached more than one game, with 0.118. Of the 23 different head coaches who have led the Blue Devils, Jones, Wade, Murray, McGee, and Spurrier have been inducted into the College Football Hall of Fame.

Key

Coaches

Notes

References

Duke

Duke Blue Devils football coaches